Wąsosz  (formerly ) is a town in Góra County, Lower Silesian Voivodeship, in western Poland. It is the seat of the administrative district (gmina) called Gmina Wąsosz. The rivers Orla and Barycz meet here.

As of 2019, the town had a population of 2,662.

History

Wąsosz dates back to the medieval Piast-ruled Kingdom of Poland and its name is of Polish origin. It was granted town rights by Henry III, Duke of Głogów in 1290. It was part of the Duchy of Głogów of fragmented Poland and in the 14th century the local castle of the Piast dukes was built. The castle was unsuccessfully besieged by the Hussites in 1432. In 1520 Wąsosz passed to the bishops of Wrocław and in 1525 it passed again under Piast rule as part of the Duchy of Legnica.

After the dissolution of the duchy in 1675, the town became part of Habsburg-ruled Bohemia, in the 18th century it was annexed by the Kingdom of Prussia. With the Prussian-led Unification of Germany, it became part of Germany in 1871 and was located in the Guhrau district in the Prussian Province of Silesia and later in the Province of Lower Silesia. During World War II, in 1943, the Germans established a camp for Polish children up to 5 years of age, who were deemed "racially worthless", and whose mothers were deported to forced labour camps in Lower Silesia. At least 485 Polish children passed through the camp, and due to its terrible sanitary conditions many died and the bodies were transported in wheelbarrows to the local cemetery. Only 39 children survived until the liberation of the camp. Local pastor Paul Tillmann rescued these children when, during the German evacuation the camp, he opposed the idea of blowing up the building with the children, and looked after them until the town was liberated.

Towards the end of World War II, the town was captured by the Soviet Red Army that was assigned to Poland. The totality of its populace was expelled for new Polish settlers to find a new home here.

Gallery

References

External links

 Town of Wąsosz official website

Cities and towns in Lower Silesian Voivodeship
Góra County